Pole Poppenspäler is an East German film. It was released in 1954. It is based on the 1874 novel Pole Poppenspäler by 19th-century German author Theodor Storm.

External links
 

1954 films
East German films
1950s German-language films
Films based on German novels
Films based on works by Theodor Storm
Films set in the 19th century
1950s German films